Jean-Jacques Allais (born January 17, 1969 in Bolbec, France) is a former professional footballer.

Allais spent one season with Veria F.C., making 14 appearances in the Greek second division.

References

External links
Jean-Jacques Allais profile at chamoisfc79.fr

1969 births
Living people
French footballers
Association football forwards
Valenciennes FC players
Chamois Niortais F.C. players
Veria F.C. players
Calais RUFC managers
Ligue 2 players
Calais RUFC players
La Tamponnaise players
SO Châtellerault players
People from Bolbec
Sportspeople from Seine-Maritime
French football managers
Wasquehal Football players
Footballers from Normandy